Gerry Carr (born 1936) is a British discus thrower.

Gerry Carr may also refer to:
Gerry Carr, footballer for Sligo Rovers
Gerry Carr, candidate for Belfast South (UK Parliament constituency)

See also
Gerald Carr (disambiguation)